The Eutaw Formation is a geological formation in North America, within the U.S. states of Alabama, Georgia, and Mississippi. The strata date from the late Coniacian to the early Santonian stage of the Late Cretaceous.  It consists of the upper Tombigbee Sand Member and an unnamed lower member.  Dinosaur, mosasaur, and pterosaur remains have been recovered from the Eutaw Formation.

Vertebrate paleofauna

Mosasaurs

Ornithodires
Dinosaur feathers have been found in the Ingersoll Shale of Georgia, which is a subunit of the Eutaw Formation. Indeterminate hadrosaurid remains have been found in Mississippi.  Ornithomimosaurs of medium-size and large-size have also been unearthed in Mississippi.

See also

List of fossil sites

References

Upper Cretaceous Series of North America
Geologic formations of Alabama
Cretaceous Georgia (U.S. state)
Cretaceous Mississippi
Paleontology in Georgia (U.S. state)
Paleontology in Alabama